Priscaenigma is an extinct genus of snakefly of the Priscaenigmatidae family which was described by Whalley in 1985. The fossils were collected by J. F. Jackson between 1961 and 1963. Its sister taxa is Hondelagia. The genus contains one species, the extinct Priscaenigma obtusa, also described by Whalley in 1985. Only a forewing was found when the species was discovered.

References

Prehistoric insects of Europe
Jurassic insects
Fossil taxa described in 1985
Raphidioptera